The discography of American country artist, Billie Jo Spears, contains 23 studio albums, 15 compilation albums, one video album, 53 singles, one charting song and has appeared on one album. Spears's first singles were issued at United Artists Records before switching to Capitol Records. The 1969 single, "Mr. Walker, It's All Over", reached the top ten on the American and Canadian country songs charts. An album of the same name followed that reached the top 30 on the American country albums chart. Her remaining years with Capitol Records failed to prove any further commercial success. The label issued four more studio albums by Spears through 1971, along with four more top 40 singles. 

Returning to United Artists Records, Spears's second label release was the number one country song, "Blanket on the Ground". The song became a top 20 single internationally, including reaching number six on the United Kingdom singles survey. It appeared as the title track of a studio album of the same, which reached the top five of the American country albums chart. Spears had several more top ten and 20 singles during the decade. In 1976, she reached the top five in the United Kingdom and the North American country charts with the singles "What I've Got in Mind" and "Misty Blue". Her 1976 album, What I've Got in Mind, was Spears' first to reach positions on the United Kingdom albums chart. Spears also collaborated with Del Reeves on two 1976 singles and a studio album.

Spears had eight more singles reach the North American country charts top 20 during the decade. This included, "Stay Away from the Apple Tree" (1975), "Never Did Like Whiskey" (1976), "I'm Not Easy" (1977), "Lonely Hearts Club" (1977) and "'57 Chevrolet" (1978). The 1977 single, "If You Want Me", reached number eight on the American country survey. These recordings also reached charts in Australia and the United Kingdom. The subsequent albums I'm Not Easy (1976), If You Want Me (1977) and Lonely Hearts Club (1978) reached chart positions on the American country albums survey. Her cover of "I Will Survive" (1979) reached the top ten of the Canadian country chart, along with charting in the United States and the United Kingdom. 

Spears had two more top 20 singles in the United States with "Standing Tall" (1980) and a cover of "Your Good Girl's Gonna Go Bad" (1981). Her 1980 album, Standing Tall, was her final to chart in the United States. Spears's final studio recording for the United Artists/Liberty labels was Only the Hits (1981). She continued recording studio albums during the eighties and nineties decades. This included a 1986 eponymous disc with the MCA and Dot labels. This also included 1991's Unmistakably and 1997's Outlaw Woman, which were both released on labels in Europe.

Albums

Studio albums

Compilation albums

Singles

As a solo artist

As a collaborative and featured artist

Other charted songs

Video albums

Other appearances

Notes

References 

Discographies of American artists
Country music discographies